The Yeshivah Centre is an Orthodox Jewish umbrella organisation in Melbourne, Victoria, Australia, that serves the needs of the Melbourne Jewish community. It is run by the Chabad-Lubavitch movement, until recently, under the direct administration of Rabbi Yitzchok Dovid Groner. Rabbi Zvi Telsner has been brought as the new Dayan (rabbinical judge) of the Centre and Lubavitch community.

Facilities 
The centre comprises a network of educational facilities that include:

Yeshivah College, a boys' school;
Beth Rivkah Ladies College, a girls' school;
the Yeshiva Shul;
Kollel Menachem Lubavitch, an outreach-focused full-time Kollel;
Ohel Chana, a girls' seminary (post-high school full-time Torah study);
Chabad Youth, an outreach organisation;
Mivtzoim Melbourne, another outreach organisation;
a network of creches, and others.

Controversies 

The Yeshivah Centre was among several Australian institutions investigated by the Royal Commission into Institutional Responses to Child Sexual Abuse which examined past incidents and the centre's response to victims. The Royal Commission delivered a specific report into practices at both the Yeshiva Centre, Melbourne and the former Yeshiva College, Sydney.

In September 2011, David Cyprys a former student and employee at the Yeshivah College was charged thirteen counts of gross indecency with a child and 16 counts of indecent assault with a child between 1984 and 1991. The youngest of his twelve alleged victims was aged 7 at the time.
In early 2012, the number of charges against David Cyprys was increased to 51 counts of gross indecency, indecent assault, false imprisonment, common law assault, attempted indecent assault and rape involving eleven alleged victims.
Victoria Police advised the Melbourne Magistrates Court in April 2012, that it intends to seek to extradite a former teacher at Yeshivah College, David Kramer, from the United States over a child sex abuse scandal that was allegedly covered up by the school.

The centre has been accused of covering up claims of sexual abuse at their institution and of retaliating against whistleblowers and victims.
 
In two separate cases, two employees were convicted and jailed in 2013. Several Chabad rabbis were accused of publicly sermonizing that it was religiously forbidden to report child sex abuse to the police. The Yeshivah's Committee of Management has subsequently been replaced and to have its Board of Trustees disbanded.

In February 2016 the educational branch of Chabad Headquarters in New York wrote to the trustees of the Yeshivah Centre objecting to its proposed restructuring, which was part of Yeshiva's response to the 2015 Royal Commission into Institutional Responses to Child Sexual Abuse. Yeshivah trustees had appointed five members to a Governance Review Panel (GRP) to recommend how the centre should be managed, including the Yeshivah, plus Beth Rivkah Colleges and all Chabad organizations in it. Rabbi Yisroel Deren of Chabad headquarters clarified the objections the Chabad HQ has made. He noted, however, that Rabbi Chaim Tzvi Groner in Melbourne has the authority to authorise the restructure that Chabad in NY is "powerless to stop any changes." The intervention by the Chabad World Headquarters angered sexual assault victims.

See also

 List of synagogues in Australia and New Zealand
 History of the Jews in Australia
 Hasidic Judaism
 Torah study

References

External links 
 School Site

Chabad organizations
Chabad yeshivas
Hasidic Judaism in Australia
Synagogues in Melbourne
Orthodox yeshivas in Australia
Chabad-Lubavitch related controversies